Barney Boyce (born 
November 2, 1960) is a retired American soccer player who played professionally in the North American Soccer League, Major Indoor Soccer League and Western Soccer Alliance.  He coached the San Jose Earthquakes in the Western Soccer Alliance.

Player
On September 13, 1979, the Washington Diplomats of the North American Soccer League signed Boyce who was eighteen at the time.  He had been playing in Yugoslavia at the time.  In the fall of 1980, the Montreal Manic purchased Boyce's contract from the Dips.  He played limited time with the Manic in 1981 before moving to the Kansas City Comets for the 1981-1982 Major Indoor Soccer League season.  

In 1982, Boyce moved to the San Jose Earthquakes.  In the fall of 1982, the team was renamed the Golden Bay Earthquakes and spent the indoor season playing in the MISL.  The Earthquakes returned to the NASL for the 1983 outdoor season.  Boyce remained with the Earthquakes through the 1984 NASL season, the 1985 independent exhibition season, and continued with the Earthquakes as they entered the Western Soccer Alliance in 1986.  He continued to play for the Earthquakes through 1988.  In 1990, he played for the Salt Lake Sting in the American Professional Soccer League. In 1992, Boyce played for the San Jose Oaks.

Coach
In 1987, Boyce became the head coach of the Earthquakes and took the team to the WSA championship game.  He began the 1988 season as head coach, but was fired in June and replaced by Tomás Boy after a poor start.

References

External links
 NASL/MISL stats

1960 births
Living people
American Professional Soccer League players
American soccer coaches
American soccer players
American expatriate soccer players
Expatriate soccer players in Canada
Golden Bay Earthquakes (MISL) players
Kansas City Comets (original MISL) players
Major Indoor Soccer League (1978–1992) players
Montreal Manic players
North American Soccer League (1968–1984) players
North American Soccer League (1968–1984) indoor players
Salt Lake Sting players
San Jose Earthquakes (1974–1988) players
San Jose Oaks players
San Jose Earthquakes (1974–1988) coaches
Washington Diplomats (NASL) players
Western Soccer Alliance coaches
Western Soccer Alliance players
Soccer players from St. Louis
Association football defenders
Association football midfielders